James Stoker may refer to:
An alternate name for Anthony Ainley, actor
James J. Stoker (1905–1992), American applied mathematician and engineer